Xyroptila is a genus of moths in the family Pterophoridae.

Species
Xyroptila aenea 
Xyroptila africana 
Xyroptila caminites 
Xyroptila colluceo 
Xyroptila dohertyi 
Xyroptila elegans 
Xyroptila falciformis 
Xyroptila fulbae 
Xyroptila irina 
Xyroptila kuranda 
Xyroptila maklaia 
Xyroptila marmarias 
Xyroptila masaia 
Xyroptila monomotapa 
Xyroptila naiwasha 
Xyroptila oenophanes 
Xyroptila oksana 
Xyroptila peltastes 
Xyroptila ruvenzori 
Xyroptila siami 
Xyroptila soma 
Xyroptila sybylla 
Xyroptila uluru 
Xyroptila variegata 
Xyroptila vaughani 
Xyroptila zambesi 

 
Platyptiliini
Moth genera